Frank Long was a trackcutter and prospector. In 1882 he discovered the Zeehan-Dundas silver-lead field on the West Coast of Tasmania.

Life and career
Frank Long was Tasmanian, having been born to ex-convicts in Launceston in approximately 1844. He spent his early years in Campbell Town. Long was a member of Charles Sprent's Mount Heemskirk expedition in 1876 and was known as a hardy and strong bushman.

Discovery of the Zeehan-Dundas Silver-Lead Field
Long discovered deposits of silver and lead in the Zeehan-Dundas silver-lead field. A nearby encampment grew, and the Mount Zeehan Post Office opened on 1 August 1888. Although Long's mineral discoveries generated wealth for many people, his later years were affected by rheumatism and alcoholism. The community of Zeehan helped Long secure a government pension so he could live out his days in dignity. Long was known as "the father of Zeehan" when he died in 1908.

Legacy
The Frank Long Memorial at Zeehan received $5,000 upgrade in 2018.

Further reading
 
 Haygarth, N. Frank Long in Alexander (ed.) The Companion to Tasmanian History. 2005.   p. 220

See also
 Thomas Bather Moore

References

History of Tasmania
Zeehan